What's Buzzin' Buzzard? is a 1943 American animated short film directed by Tex Avery, produced by Fred Quimby, and musical score by Scott Bradley. The short pokes fun at the food shortages common at the time. The plot focuses on two turkey vultures struggling to find food in the desert. It was released to theaters on November 27, 1943 by Metro-Goldwyn-Mayer. Producer Fred Quimby disliked the cartoon but was surprised when it was put under the preservation in the Library of Congress. It is currently available on the Tex Avery Screwball Classics: Volume 1 Blu-Ray. The cartoon during production was under the title "Vulture A La King".

Plot
The short begins in the Painted Desert as a Jimmy Durante sound alike turkey vulture (voiced by Patrick McGeehan) complains to his friend Joe (voiced by Kent Rogers) about his hunger that his stomach literally starts to talk back to him, "Send down one hamburger! Everything on it!" The Durante Vulture quotes "See what I mean!" When Joe is asked by the Durante Vulture how he's doing, Joe opens his mouth where there is a spider web with a sign that reads "Closed for the duration". The Durante Vulture expresses his desire for a T-bone steak. A picture of a steak is shown on the screen for a couple seconds with "Auld Lang Syne" playing the background followed by a sign that reads "3 minute intermission for drooling - The Management".

They later spot a jackrabbit (also voiced by Rogers) and fight over him. They get caught up in their fight and the rabbit gets away. The vultures then start to plot against each other and try eating other. The Durante vulture sits next to a rock and Joe sneakily makes a sandwich with his hand. The Durante vulture lets out a yelp (voiced by William Hanna), and when he questions Joe's actions he lies and explains he has a toothache. He asks him to examine his tooth while and tries to bite his head. Joe begins to salt the Durante vulture's tail before he hits him on the head with a mallet. The Durante Vulture starts to read a book on cooking and is unknowingly being cooked in a pot by Joe. The Durante Vulture soon realizes this and runs into a log cabin. Joe tricks him into coming outside by pretending to see a beautiful woman. The Durante Vulture comes out and Joe hits him on the head and then covers him with butter before Joe gets up and runs. The two vultures chase after each other until The Durante Vulture pretends to be a rattlesnake which causes Joe to faint. However immediately afterwards, the Durante Vulture sees a real one and faints himself.

The Durante Vulture later paints a rock to look like a steak and calls Joe over to eat it. Joe eats it perfectly as if it were a real steak. The Durante Vulture tries to do the same only to break his teeth. The vultures get in a scuffle that turns into a whirlwind. Joe escapes and pulls a pot under Durante Vulture only to notice that he has disappeared. The Durante Vulture is revealed to have put a broiling pan under Joe, which he slams a lid on, puts in an oven and locks the oven shut. The Durante Vulture sits on top of the stove which is revealed to be a conveyor belt to a meat slicer. The Durante Vulture barely escapes being sliced and runs into a hole, and Joe uses a pickaxe to get to him. The Durante Vulture pops up from another hole behind him and while trying to decapitate Joe proceeds to chop the cactus. The Durante Vulture grows tired and surrenders. He goes over to have himself beheaded and Joe almost does, but the Durante Vulture runs after Joe with the butcher knife.

The vultures chase each other with various weapons around a rock until the Durante Vulture notices that the rabbit has returned. They capture the rabbit and fight over him only for the rabbit to break it up and asks if they know what day it is as he shows them the calendar date that says "Meatless Tuesday". Having realized they fought over the rabbit for nothing, the vultures bawl hysterically.

Before the cartoon can end, a "Patrons Attention" title card appears as the announcer (voiced by John Wald) quotes the following:

The picture of the T-bone steak is shown again with "Auld Lang Syne" playing in the background as the cartoon ends.

See also
 The House of Tomorrow - Another MGM cartoon that had a "Patrons Attention" at the end of it.

References

External links
 
 Credits for the cartoon

1943 films
1943 animated films
1943 short films
Films directed by Tex Avery
1940s American animated films
1940s animated short films
Metro-Goldwyn-Mayer animated short films
Films scored by Scott Bradley
Cultural depictions of Jimmy Durante
Films produced by Fred Quimby
Films set in Arizona
Films set in deserts
Animated films about birds